Gert Willner was a CDU politician in Schleswig-Holstein. He was a member of the Bundestag for Pinneberg from the 1994 federal election until his death.

External links

  From the Bundestag website

1940 births
2000 deaths
Christian Democratic Union of Germany politicians
People from Jablonné v Podještědí
Sudeten German people
Members of the Bundestag for Schleswig-Holstein
Members of the Bundestag 1998–2002
Members of the Bundestag 1994–1998